Eugène Baudouin (6 January 1842, in Montpellier – 4 January 1893, in Paris) was a French painter and printmaker.

Biography 

Eugène Baudouin was an impressionist landscape painter, printmaker and illustrator. 

Eugène Baudouin studied under Jean-Léon Gérôme, Auguste-Barthélemy Glaize, Léopold Flameng, François-Louis Français, Eugène Devéria, and Adrien Didier. He exhibited on a regular basis at the Paris Salon until his death in 1893. His landscapes are constructed along schematic lines and on a succession of levels in order to give the impression of a panorama. In 1889, he participated in the 1889 World's Fair in Paris.

At the Paris Salon 1882, a bust of Baudouin was exhibited by Joseph Osbach.

Family 

Eugène Baudouin was married to Léonie Baudouin (1850-1910), daughter of Noël Parfait, deputy of Eure-et-Loir. They are  buried together in Division 55 of Père-Lachaise cemetery in Paris.

Paintings

References

Notes 
 Bénézit, 1976 : Eugène Baudouin

External links 
 Benezit; oxford art online
 Inventaire du fonds français après 1800; BNF
 Les salins de Villeneuve en 1875 
 Société archéologique, scientifique et littéraire, BNF
 Eugène Baudouin, The British Museum
 Le livre d'or de Victor Hugo, La tombe de Jean Valjean, BNF
 ezola.fr; Marie Delna
 Exposition De La Cigale, 2; BNF
 The Breaking Of The Ice Near The Neuilly Bridge By The Tugboats; Extraction of ice in the Bois de Boulogne; E.Baudouin, L'Univers illustré; BNF
 Engravings in the collection of the Musée Rodin.
 Dictionnaire Véron, ou mémorial de l'art et des artistes de mon temps, 1877; Eugène Baudouin; BNF
 La République (journal (Montpellier)), 1877-05-15; Eugène Baudouin; BNF
 Journal de Montpellier, 1869-11-13; Eugène Baudouin; BNF

French male painters
1842 births
1893 deaths
19th-century French painters
Landscape artists
École des Beaux-Arts alumni
French Impressionist painters
French illustrators
People from Montpellier
Artists from Montpellier
French marine artists
French landscape painters
19th-century French male artists